Hesar Qaranqu (also Romanized as Ḩeşār Qarānqū; also known as Ḩeşār and Ḩeşār Qarānlū) is a village in Owch Tappeh-ye Sharqi Rural District, in the Central District of Meyaneh County, East Azerbaijan Province, Iran. At the 2006 census, its population was 145, in 32 families.

References 

Populated places in Meyaneh County